El General Naranjo is a Colombian crime drama television series created by Anita de Hoyos and produced by Fox Telecolombia based on the book El general de las mil batallas written by Julio Sánchez Cristo. The series revolves around Óscar Naranjo (Christian Meier), a Colombian general who was very influential in ending drug trafficking in Colombia and destroying Pablo Escobar and his army of criminals. The series premiered in Latin America 24 May 2019 on Fox Premium, and during its premiere Fox released the full episodes through its subscription app, the full seasons can be viewed all by subscription, while Fox airs one episode on television every Friday, except for the second season, which aired the last episode on a Saturday.

The series consists of 52 one-hour episodes, divided into 3 seasons, which were filmed consecutively. The first season tells about Óscar Naranjo's beginnings in the Police and focuses on the fight against the Medellín cartel. The second season focuses on how he was ascending in the police institution, and the entire strategy to catch the drug traffickers of the Cali and Norte del Valle cartels, who kept a lower profile and were much smarter and less impulsive. While the third season continues the conflict with the FARC and with the paramilitaries, and the role of Naranjo in the peace agreement.

In Colombia, the series premiered on 15 April 2020 on Caracol Televisión, broadcasting the first two seasons consecutively from Monday to Friday.

Plot 
This is the story of Óscar Naranjo (Christian Meier) and Colombia in recent decades, told from the point of view of those who did their best to maintain order and law against Pablo Escobar, paramilitarism, drug cartels and the FARC.

Cast

Main 
 Christian Meier as General Óscar Naranjo
 Julián Román as El Liso
 Juliana Galviz as Claudia Luque
 Diego Cadavid as Teniente Héctor Talero (season 1)
 Juan Pablo Shuk as Gilberto Rodríguez Orejuela
 Laura Ramos as Rita Cienfuegos 
 Viña Machado as Esperanza (season 1)
 Federico Rivera as Pablo Escobar
 Walter Luengas as Gonzalo Rodríguez Gacha
 Andrés Toro as Gustavo Gaviria Rivero
 Juan Pablo Franco as Miguel Rodríguez Orejuela
 Aldemar Correa as Teniente Fonseca
 Brian Moreno as Agente Bustamante
 Carlos Manuel Vesga as Sargento Andrande
 Morris Bravo as Interno 2 (season 2)
 Diego Garzón as Pablo Jr (adolescent)

Recurring 
 Diana Hoyos as Valentina Montoya
 Susana Rojas as Zaida Guzmán
 Katherine Vélez as Amparo de Naranjo
 Luis Carlos Fuquen as Darío Correa
 Joavany Álvarez as General Sarmiento
 Maruia Shelton as La Canciller
 Esmeralda Pinzón as Yesenia
 Luis Guillermo Blanco Rossi as Juan David Naranjo
 Guillermo Gálvez as General Naranjo Father
 Juan Carlos Arango as Miguel Maza Márquez
 Ernesto Benjumea as Belisario Bentacourt
 Liss Pereira as Carla Gómez
 Carlos Camacho as Sergio Maldonado

Episodes

Series overview

Season 1 (2019)

Season 2 (2019)

Season 3 (2020)

Notes

References

External links 
 

Colombian television series
2019 Colombian television series debuts
Spanish-language television shows
Television series about organized crime
Television series produced by Fox Telecolombia
Fox Broadcasting Company original programming
2020 Colombian television series endings
Works about organized crime in Colombia